The Belmont Report is a report created by the National Commission for the Protection of Human Subjects of Biomedical and Behavioral Research. Its full title is the Belmont Report: Ethical Principles and Guidelines for the Protection of Human Subjects of Research, Report of the National Commission for the Protection of Human Subjects of Biomedical and Behavioral Research.

The report was issued on  September 30, 1978 and published in the Federal Register on April 18, 1979. The report took its name from the Belmont Conference Center where the document was drafted in part.  The Belmont Conference Center, once a part of the Smithsonian Institution, is in Elkridge, Maryland, 10 miles south of Baltimore, and until the end of 2010 was operated by Howard Community College.

The Belmont Report summarizes ethical principles and guidelines for research involving human subjects. Three core principles are identified: respect for persons, beneficence, and justice. Three primary areas of application are also stated. They are informed consent, assessment of risks and benefits, and selection of subjects.
According to Vollmer and Howard, the Belmont Report allows for a positive solution, which at times may be difficult to find, to future subjects who are not capable to make independent decisions.

History
The Belmont Report was first written by the National Commission for the Protection of Human Subjects of Biomedical and Behavioral Research. Prompted in part by problems arising from the Tuskegee Syphilis Study (1932–1972) and based on the National Commission for the Protection of Human Subjects of Biomedical and Behavioral Research (1974–1978), the Department of Health, Education and Welfare (HEW) revised and expanded its regulations for the protection of human subjects 45 CFR part 46 in the late 1970s and early 1980s.  In 1978, the commission's report Ethical Principles and Guidelines for the Protection of Human Subjects of Research was released, and it was published in 1979 in the Federal Register.  It was named the Belmont Report, for the Belmont Conference Center, where the National Commission met when first drafting the report.
The Belmont Report is one of the leading works concerning ethics and health care research. It allows for the protection of participants in clinical trials and research studies.

The Belmont Report explains the unifying ethical principles that form the basis for the National Commission's topic-specific reports and the regulations that incorporate its recommendations.

The three fundamental ethical principles for using any human subjects for research are:
 Respect for persons: protecting the autonomy of all people and treating them with courtesy and respect and allowing for informed consent. Researchers must be truthful and conduct no deception;
 Beneficence: the philosophy of "Do no harm" while maximizing benefits for the research project and minimizing risks to the research subjects; and
 Justice: ensuring reasonable, non-exploitative, and well-considered procedures are administered fairly — the fair distribution of costs and benefits to potential research participants — and equally.

These principles remain the basis for the United States Department of Health and Human Services (HHS) human subject protection regulations.

Today, the Belmont Report continues as an essential reference for institutional review boards (IRBs) that review HHS-conducted or -supported human subjects research proposals involving human subjects, in order to ensure that the research meets the ethical foundations of the regulations.

Applications of these principles to conduct research requires careful consideration of i) informed consent, ii) risks benefit assessment, and iii)selection of subjects of research.

Outlined by Jennifer Sims in her article "A brief review of the Belmont Report", she states 7 things nurses, as primary caregivers for individuals participating in a study, must do to ensure the rights of the participant are met. 
 Ensure the study is approved by an IRB
 Get informed consent from the patient
 Ensure that the patient understands the full extent of the experiment, and if not, will contact the study coordinator 
 Ensure the patient wasn't coerced into doing the experiment by means of threatening or bullying
 Be careful of other effects of the clinical trial that were not mentioned, and report it to the proper study coordinator 
 Support the privacy of the patient's identity, their motivation to join or refuse the experiment.
 Ensure that all patients at least get the minimal care needed for their condition

Researchers must share the findings of their procedures regardless of them being good or bad results. Also in the case someone did not want to participate in research but would like treatment they cannot be turned away and must be treated with the same standard care.

Summary
The summary, from the top of the Report:

The Belmont report itself consists of 3 clauses: A. Boundaries between Practice and Research, B. Basic Ethical Principles, C. Applications.

Boundaries Between Practice and Research
This clause establishes the differences between biomedical and behavioral research, and that the different areas of research, require different protections for human participants. Examining the differences between "practice" and "research", practice is dealing with bettering the wellbeing of an individual or group, while research is testing a theory and potentially has an unknown ending. This difference, establishes that they require different protections for human participants, and when any amount of research is occurring, it should be reviewed for the protection those involved.

Basic Ethical Principles
This clause covers, three ethical principles; Respect for Persons, Beneficence, and Justice.

Respect for Persons
This ethical principle describes individuals as autonomous agents. Stating that an autonomous agent is an individual capable of deliberation regarding their personal goals, and who is able to be guided by that deliberation. It acknowledges that while most individuals are capable of making the decision, some groups of people require more protections. Some lose their capacity for self-determination due to illness, mental disabilities, or other circumstances. Children, and the groups just mentioned, are to be granted protections, either temporarily or permanently, until the individual is capable of self-determination. These protections range from ensuring that the individual understands and is freely participating in the research, to excluding the individual from harm.

Beneficence
This principle, in short, emphasizes the maximization of benefits, and minimization of potential harms. Especially when dealing with those who require further protections, from the Respect for Persons principle. Scientific researchers are urged to consider, not just the immediate consequences, but also the long term consequences of their research.

Justice
This principle deals with the distribution of benefits and burdens of research. It puts forward 5 different formulations, on how to base the distribution, 1, all given an equal share, 2, based on need, 3, based on individual effort, 4, based on societal contribution, 5, based on merit. This principle described the circumstances of the Tuskegee Syphilis Study, and explains the importance of the participants getting recognition and the possible benefits of research. It also mentions the exploitation of unwilling prisoners, as research participants, in the Nazi concentration camps.

Applications
This clause is broken down into three parts, informed consent, Assessment of Risk and Benefits, Selection of Subjects.

Informed Consent
This section is further broken down into three parts, information, comprehension, and voluntariness.

Information: 
Ensuring that the participants, are not only given all the relevant information, but that the information is presented in an understandable and researchable way.

Comprehension: 
The participants should be capable of understanding the information; if they aren't, the third party in-charge of their safety (part of the protections from the Basic Ethical Principles, the Beneficence section) should be given the information regarding the research, and presented it in an understandable manner.

Voluntariness: 
Participants shouldn't be under any unjustifiable pressures to participate in research. This can include coercion, undue influence by excessive or inappropriate reward, influence by a close relative, threatening to withdraw health services, and other comparable situations. Individuals should make the decision to participate without being pressured by any unwarranted sources.

Assessment of Risk and Benefits

It should be correctly assessed that the benefits should overweights the risks.

Always risk:benefit ratio should be balanced.

Selection of Subjects
It should be of two types that are as follows : 

1) Individual justice

2) Social justice

Burdens & benefits are equally shared irrespective of person's dignity, ability, rich, poor.

Today
In 1991, 14 other Federal departments and agencies joined HHS in adopting a uniform set of rules for the protection of human subjects, identical to subpart A of 45 CFR part 46 of the HHS regulations.  This uniform set of regulations is the Federal Policy for the Protection of Human Subjects, informally known as the "Common Rule". The Office for Human Research Protections (OHRP) was also established within HHS.

Today, the Belmont Report both serves as a historical document and provides the moral framework for understanding regulations in the United States on the use of humans in experimental methods.
Additionally, the 'Revised Common Rule', issued as a Final Rule on January 19, 2017, and mainly coming into effect two years later, on January 21, 2019, included 2 changes which instituted the Belmont Report as part of the Protection of Human Subjects federal policy.
    Firstly, a Department/Agency head waiver clause, which previously allowed federal department or agency heads to waive parts or all of the Common Rule without restrictions, is now restricted by the contours of the Belmont Report.  The Revised Common Rule clearly states: "Unless otherwise required by law, department or agency heads may waive the applicability of some or all of the provisions of this policy to specific research activities or classes of research activities otherwise covered by this policy, provided the alternative procedures to be followed are consistent with the principles of the Belmont Report." [Revised Common Rule at 45 CFR 46.101(i)]
    Secondly, a Department/Agency head determinations clause, which previously provided Department/Agency heads with the power and discretion to decide whether an activity qualifies as Human Research which is subject to the federal policy, now requires that "this judgment [determination] shall be exercised consistent with the ethical principles of the Belmont Report." [Revised Common Rule at 45 CFR 46.101(c)]

Psychology
In the field of psychology, the Belmont Report has been heavily supplemented, if not entirely replaced, by the American Psychological Association's (APA) Ethical Principles of Psychologists and Code of Conduct. The APA's guidelines include the basics provided in the originally published Belmont Report, but also enhance and reinforce those established principles. Just as the Belmont Report details the principles of beneficence, respect for persons, and justice, the APA details them further and expands the three initial guidelines into five: (1) beneficence, (2) respect for persons, (3) justice, with the addition of (4) fidelity and responsibility, as well as (5) integrity.

The principle of fidelity and responsibility ensures that researchers establish trust and a sense of responsibility for their study and its possible repercussions. The principle of integrity furthers this concept into honesty and accuracy throughout all professional psychological endeavors. The inclusion of the last two principles has become pertinent in modern science and research. As ethical practices are constantly evolving, the frequently revised APA guidelines have, in some fields, replaced the practical use of The Belmont Report. The report currently serves as more of a foundation for the ever-growing caution and attention paid to ethical practices used in psychological experiments.

Another area where APA guidelines move beyond the Belmont report is in the setting of standards. The APA establishes standards for all reputable members of the psychology community (particularly those members of the American Psychological Association). The association sets a code of conduct for all APA individuals, which, when violated, can result in termination of professional licensure or membership.

One of the most important standards that is detailed in the APA manual is the one that requires the induction of an institutional review board (IRB), which serves the same purpose as outlined in the Belmont Report. An IRB is responsible for interpreting the established principles and ensuring the ethicality of research done on humans. Other standards are completely beyond the scope of the Belmont Report but have since been added to the APA manual. One such standard is the ethical treatment of animals (the report's full title being 'Ethical Principles and Guidelines for the Protection of Human Subjects of Research'), something that has become a resurgent topic in recent years.

The APA Guidelines have evolved into a more modern approach to ethics in research, and are frequently updated (with nearly nine revisions since its original publication), building on the Belmont Report's foundation as new information becomes available and changes occur in opinion and societal acceptance. While the Belmont Report when published was a beneficial first step to ensuring ethical practice, today it serves as a reminder of the ever-changing moral guidelines in psychology. It was nevertheless an important collection of regulations in response to the Tuskegee Study (1932-1972) that provided the first stepping stones to modern ethical practice in psychological research.

Critique
In a study by Nancy Shore, community-based participatory researchers were interviewed for their interpretation and critique of the Belmont Report. Interviewees expressed concerns regarding the Belmont Reports ethical principles and interpretations as being one size fits all and advocated researchers to resist the tendency to rely on those principles systematically. It argues that the ethical analysis should be extended to take into account more appropriate factors, such as cultural, gender, ethnic and geographical considerations. Debate continues over the ethics and regulations of research involving human subjects because of discrepancies over the meaning and priority of the Belmont Reports basic ethical principles: respect for persons, beneficence, and justice. Notably, the Belmont Report does not specify how its three ethical principles should be weighted or prioritized. According to Albert R. Jonsen, a member of the National Commission that composed the report, the Institutional Review Board is charged with weighing these principles and deciding how they should be applied. Matters become controversial when deciding if the principles should be interpreted as more or less weighty depending upon the particular circumstances of the research in question, if the principles should be viewed as an obligation that society must undertake on behalf of its members, or if it should be viewed as giving absolute priority to respect for persons' autonomy over the general good of society.

See also
Human experimentation in the United States
Clinical trial
Informed consent
Tuskegee Syphilis Study
Menlo Report

References

External links

The Belmont Report - U.S. Health & Human Services website
Belmont Report, original version, 30 September 1978
Belmont Report, Federal Register, 18 April 1979
Revisiting the Belmont Report, Mar. - Apr., 2001
comparison of the Common Rule and the Revised Common Rule
about the Revised Common Rule

Medical ethics
Human subject research in the United States
Ethics literature
American medical research
Clinical research ethics